Commonwealth School is a private high school of about 155 students and 35 faculty members located in the Back Bay neighborhood of Boston, Massachusetts, United States. It is accredited by the New England Association of Schools and Colleges.

History

Charles E. Merrill Jr., son of the founder of Merrill Lynch, and brother of the prominent American poet James Merrill, founded the school in 1957, locating it in Boston's Back Bay to "restore good secondary schooling to the city."  He encouraged Commonwealth students to be "decent, socially responsible, generous people," actively engaged in public affairs.  For some decades after his retirement, Merrill returned to the school once a year to give a speech on a topic of his choice, and his books are on display in the school library alongside those of Commonwealth alumni.

Merrill insisted that the school has only one rule: "No rollerskating in the halls,"—an exhortation that students should not "...act like a damn fool, but think about your actions and how they affect others."

Merrill retired in 1981, and his memoir of the first 23 years of the school's history and his experience as headmaster, The Walled Garden, was published the following year.

Symbols
The school's symbol is a mermaid with a sword and shield, derived from the coat of arms of Warsaw, Poland.  This symbol appears on the school flag, publications, and the outside of the building.

There is no official school song, but "The Spacious Firmament On High" (Joseph Addison, Joseph Haydn) is sung each year at the opening of school and at the graduation ceremony.

Heads of school

There have been six heads of school:
 1957–1981: Charles E. Merrill Jr.
 1981–1983: Joseph "Jay" Featherstone
 1983–1990: Charles Chatfield
 1990–2000: Judith Keenan
 2000–2021: William Wharton
 2021–present: Jennifer Borman

Clubs and activities
Student-run clubs and groups at Commonwealth include:
 Chess Club
 Commonwealth Chronicle (Newspaper)
 Community Service (Commonwealth Cares)
  Coding Club
 Debate Team
 Diversity Committee
 Environmental Committee
 Evil Genius Club
 Football Club 
 Gender-Sexuality Alliance
 Literary Magazine (Helicon)
 Math Team
 Model United Nations
 Model Congress
 Physics Club
 Prom Committee
 Robotics Club
 Yearbook Committee

Each year, the rising senior class elects two non-voting representatives to Commonwealth's Board of Trustees.  The other grades elect two members as well to explain issues within their grades to the two representative seniors.

Performance
In its September, 2009 issue, Boston magazine named Commonwealth as the best private high school in eastern Massachusetts.

Academically, the school is one of the nation's elite. A significant portion of the senior class is recognized each year by the National Merit Scholarship Program. From 2012 to 2016, 16% of students were recognized as Finalists, 20% as Semifinalists, and 43% as Commended Students. In that same period 28 students were named as AP National Scholars, 111 as Scholars with Distinction, 42 as Scholars with Honor, and 53 as Scholars by the College Board. Mean SAT scores for the classes of 2015 and 2016 were 738 in critical reading, 718 in writing, and 714 in math.

Commonwealth had a semifinalist in the Intel Science Talent Search in 2011, 2012, and 2013, the only Massachusetts school to do so.

Commonwealth is the only Massachusetts school to receive a grant from the Malone Scholars program of the Malone Family Foundation, which independently identifies top-level schools to receive an endowment. "Once endowed, the schools are empowered to perpetually fund scholarships to motivated top students based on merit and financial need."

From 2001 to 2015, the most popular college choices were Brown (22 graduates), the  University of Chicago (22), Harvard (17), Tufts (17), New York University (16), Wesleyan (15), Bryn Mawr (14), Carleton (14), Columbia (14), Yale (13), Smith (13), and Haverford (13).

School events

Assemblies
Commonwealth holds an assembly every Thursday. Speakers have included Archbishop Desmond Tutu, Ted Sorensen, literature critic James Wood, author Claire Messud, Michael Kelly of The Atlantic, Harvard Law professors Charles Fried and Lani Guinier, author Samantha Power, Harvard stem cell biologist Douglas Melton, philosopher and bioethicist Frances Kamm, poet Louise Glück, former ambassadors Peter W. Galbraith and Charles Stith, Mary Beth Cahill, acclaimed American feminist and civil rights activist Peggy McIntosh, free software pioneer Richard Stallman, Congressman Barney Frank, Senator Elizabeth Warren, Boston mayor Michelle Wu, former Surgeon General C. Everett Koop, Boston city councilor Tito Jackson and various musical groups. Students petition the head of school to invite speakers they would like to hear.

Special assemblies are held for Thanksgiving and on the day before winter vacation. It is tradition to sing "Bringing in the Sheaves" (by Shaw and Minor) every Thanksgiving assembly, and for students and teachers to recite poems at the Winter Holiday assembly. Other assemblies highlight students' work on independent projects, fiction writing, music, and theater.

Sports and recreation
Each year students participate in a competitive sport or organized exercise activity in at least two out of three seasons.  Competitive sports include soccer, basketball, fencing, cross-country running, and Ultimate Frisbee. Exercise programs include running, fitness, sailing, dance, ballroom dance, and yoga.

Hancock
When Charles Merrill was headmaster he started a tradition of twice-yearly trips to his family's farm in Hancock, New Hampshire. These would happen every fall and spring. The school continued to go up to the farm every semester until 1996. The "Hancock" weekend eventually moved in 1997 to Camp Winona, a summer camp in Bridgton, Maine, but the old name remains. The trip to Maine was replaced by a day trip to Provincetown in 2007, and a weekend at Camp Wing, a summer camp in Duxbury, Massachusetts, in 2008. In 2009, Spring Hancock returned to Camp Winona. For the 2020-21 school year, a modified version of Hancock, lasting only a day and taking place in the city, took place due to COVID-19 precautions. In the fall of 2021, Hancock took place at Camp Kingswood. In the spring of 2022, another "Hancock-in-the-City" took place, this time with a trip to a reservation near Boston and a sleepover at the school.

Activities
On two mornings during each trip, students and teachers organize activities to do, and each student signs up for an activity.

In the afternoons, students are free, and activities such as swimming, boating, various sports, and hiking are offered.

On the last night of Hancock, there is a talent show prepared jointly by the students and staff. There are also two dances: the "Long Dance" the night before the talent show, and the "Short Dance" after it, both organized by the students.

Jobs
The responsibility for Hancock is shared among faculty and students. Faculty oversee various tasks, such as cooking or sports. Students can sign up for jobs such as cooking meals, running the talent show and dances, and being a bike messenger.  For the most part, cleaning bathrooms, collecting trash, tending fires, and other tasks are also led and staffed by students.

Publications
There are several student-run publications at Commonwealth.  They include:

 Yearbook: Each year, the senior class (and a few juniors in training) produces its own yearbook.
 Helicon: The literary magazine club, with the school's funding, publishes a literary magazine, which accepts many types of literature and art, including poems, short stories, photographs, drawings, and paintings. 
 The Commonwealth Chronicle: The school's newspaper, which includes a satirical publication called The Leek.

The school produces CM, a twice-yearly magazine for alumni/ae and parents.

Notable alumni
David Altshuler, geneticist and co-founder of MIT's Broad Institute
Patrick Amory, Matador Records general manager
Mikaela Beardsley, film producer 
Emily Botein, public radio producer
Loren Bouchard, animator and television director (dropped out before graduating)
Jonatha Brooke, singer/songwriter
Evan Dando and Ben Deily of The Lemonheads
Mark Denbeaux, attorney and civil rights activist
John Davis of The Folk Implosion
Liza Featherstone, journalist
Peter W. Galbraith, diplomat
Melissa Glenn Haber, author and teacher
Kaitlyn Greenidge, author of We Love You Charlie Freeman and New York Times contributing opinion writer
Mark Greif, co-founder, co-editor and contributor to n+1
Karen Guillemin, microbiologist
Susanna Kaysen, author of Girl, Interrupted, among other works, and has included references to Commonwealth in her books
Anthony Kuhn, NPR correspondent
Kasi Lemmons, director (IMDB page)
Hamish Linklater, actor (IMDB page)
Mia Matsumiya, violinist of experimental rock group Kayo Dot
Sophia Michahelles, pageant puppet designer and co-artistic director, Processional Arts Workshop
Ottessa Moshfegh, author
Jesse Peretz, film director and former Lemonheads bassist (IMDB page)
Nina Pillard, judge, U.S. Court of Appeals for the District of Columbia Circuit
Daniel Pipes, historian, foreign policy analyst, Middle East & Islam specialist
Jonathan Rotenberg, founder of the Boston Computer Society, while still a student at Commonwealth
Cameron Russell, model
Benjamin Sargent, celebrity chef and television personality

Traditions
Each day includes "Recess," when all students and faculty gather in the school's multi-purpose room for a snack and to hear announcements. Anyone—student or teacher—is invited to make an announcement. The Tuesday recess is longer than the others, allowing for short presentations or discussions.

Each May seniors use an extended Tuesday recess to perform skits that parody their teachers and themselves. During another recess, they give various awards to students.

Another tradition is "passing the clay," where all students take part in passing boxes of clay from the first to the fifth floor. This event happens twice a year.

Trademark dispute
In June 2016, the Boston Globe reported that Commonwealth School sued Commonwealth Academy, a high school in Springfield, Massachusetts, over the use of the name "Commonwealth". It had trademarked "Commonwealth School" in 2012. The Springfield school is now known as Springfield Commonwealth Academy.

References

External links

 Official website

Private high schools in Massachusetts
High schools in Boston
Educational institutions established in 1957
1957 establishments in Massachusetts